Mirt Sost Shi Amit (Harvest: 3,000 Years) is a 1976 Ethiopian film directed by Haile Gerima.

Plot
For the production of Mirt Sost Shi Amit (Harvest: 3,000 Years) Gerima returned to his native Ethiopia to produce the tale of a poor peasant family who eke out an existence within a brutal, exploitative, and feudal system of labor.

Production
Harvest: 3,000 Years was shot on black and white 16mm film.  It used non-actors, and was shot in the midst of a civil war after the overthrow of Haile Selassie.
Haile Gerima has said

Cast
 Kasu Yigzaw...  Mother
 Gebru Kasa
 Worke Kasa ...  Daughter
 Melaku Makonen ...  Father
 Adane Melaku ...  Son
 Harege-Weyn Tafere ...  Grandmother

References

External links

1976 films
Ethiopian documentary films
Amharic-language films
English-language Ethiopian films
1976 drama films
Ethiopian black-and-white films
Films directed by Haile Gerima
1970s English-language films